Keon Park railway station is located on the Mernda line in Victoria, Australia. It serves the northern Melbourne suburb of Thomastown, and it opened on 16 December 1929 as Keonpark. It was renamed Keon Park on 29 February 1972.

History

Opening on 16 December 1929, the locality, and more particularly the railway station of Keon Park, was named after Keon Park Pty Ltd., a land development company formed in 1924. Among the directors was Henry Isaac Cohen, a Barrister and M.L.C. and later a King’s Counsel, Minister of Education and Minister for Water Supply, who married Ethel Mary Keon in 1901 and whose children adopted the surname of “Keon-Cohen”.

The station opened at the same time as the extension of suburban services and electrification from Reservoir to Thomastown. In November 1959, the line from Reservoir was duplicated, in conjunction with the extension of suburban services to Lalor. However, the duplicated line converged at the Up end of the Keon Parade level crossing, and it wasn't until 1988 that the current Platform 2 was provided. The crossover, located at the Up end of the station and just past the level crossing, was also provided around this time. It remained the northern extremity for the double line until November 2011, when the line from Keon Park to Epping was duplicated.

In 1963, flashing light signals were provided at the Keon Parade level crossing, with boom barriers provided later on in 1971. On 15 April 1972, a small fire damaged the interior of the station building. On 1 September 1973, the station was again damaged by fire, as well as damage occurring to the signal box. It was also around this time that the former City of Preston and former local member for the now abolished District of Reservoir, Jim Simmonds, asked the Victorian Railways for opinions on relocating the station to the Up side of the level crossing, to allow better access from nearby residential areas.

In 1983, the current station building was provided, replacing an older timber structure. In 1986, a number of sidings that were located at the Down end of the station were abolished.

On 29 July 2021, the Level Crossing Removal Project announced that the level crossing will be grade separated by 2025, with the railway line to be built over the road, and will include a rebuilt station. On 28 March 2022, the LXRP announced that the station would be rebuilt to the south of the current level crossing.

Platforms and services

Keon Park has one island platform with two faces. It is serviced by Metro Trains' Mernda line services.

Platform 1:
  all stations and limited express services to Flinders Street

Platform 2:
  all stations services to Mernda

Transport links

Dysons operates one route via Keon Park station, under contract to Public Transport Victoria:
 : Pacific Epping – Northland Shopping Centre

Kinetic Melbourne operates one SmartBus route via Keon Park station, under contract to Public Transport Victoria:
  : Chelsea station – Westfield Airport West

References

External links
 Melway map at street-directory.com.au

Railway stations in Melbourne
Railway stations in Australia opened in 1929
Railway stations in the City of Whittlesea